The nLab is a wiki for research-level notes, expositions and collaborative work, including original research, in mathematics, physics, and philosophy, with a focus on methods from type theory, category theory, and homotopy theory. The nLab espouses the "n-point of view" (a deliberate pun on Wikipedia's "neutral point of view") that type theory, homotopy theory, category theory, and higher category theory provide a useful unifying viewpoint for mathematics, physics and philosophy. The n in n-point of view could refer to either n-categories as found in higher category theory, n-groupoids as found in both homotopy theory and higher category theory, or n-types as found in homotopy type theory.

Overview
The nLab  was originally conceived to provide a repository for ideas (and even new research) generated in the comments on posts at the n-Category Café, a group blog run (at the time) by John C. Baez, David Corfield and Urs Schreiber. Eventually the nLab developed into an independent project, which has since grown to include whole research projects and encyclopedic material. 

Associated to the nLab is the nForum, an online discussion forum for announcement and discussion of nLab edits (the analog of Wikipedia's "talk" pages) as well as for general discussion of the topics covered in the nLab.  The preferred way of contacting the nLab steering committee is to post on the nForum. An experimental sub-project of the nLab is the Publications of the nLab, intended as a journal for refereed research articles that are published online and cross-hyperlinked with the main wiki.

The nLab was set up on November 28, 2008 by Urs Schreiber using the Instiki software provided and maintained by Jacques Distler. Since May 2015 it runs on a server at Carnegie Mellon University that is funded in the context of Steve Awodey's Homotopy Type Theory MURI grant. The system administrator is Richard Williamson. The domain ncatlab.org is owned by Urs Schreiber. 

The nLab is listed on MathOverflow as a standard online mathematics reference to check before asking questions. Many questions and answers link to the nLab for background material. It is one of two wikis mentioned by the mathematical physicist John C. Baez in his review of math blogs for the American Mathematical Society.

There is an informal steering committee, which "doesn't run the nLab", but exists in order to resolve issues that would cause the whole project to run into trouble.

See also
MathOverflow

References

External links 
 nLab
 nForum
 Publications of the nLab

Mathematics websites